Tafawa Balewa's tomb is the burial place of Sir Abubakar Tafawa Balewa, the only Prime Minister of Nigeria, in Bauchi, Bauchi State, Nigeria.

History 
During the 1966 Nigerian coup d'état, Abubakar Tafawa Balewa, the prime minister of Nigeria, was kidnapped and his body was found by the roadside six days after the kidnapping. He was then buried in Bauchi where he was born. His tomb was declared as a nationwide monument on August 29, 1979, by the military administrator of the state, Brigadier Garba Duba.

The construction of the monument and the buildings surrounding the tomb began in 1977 and it was authorized in July 1979.

References 

Bauchi State
Tourism by city